The World Wrestling Championships are the Greco-Roman Wrestling (men's, since 1904) & Freestyle Wrestling (men's since 1951 and women's since 1987) World Championships organized by the United World Wrestling.

Competitions

Men's freestyle

Men's Greco-Roman

Women's freestyle

Combined

All-time medal table
Updated after the 2022 World Wrestling Championships.

 Names in italic are national entities that no longer exist.

Team titles

Multiple gold medalists
The tables shows those who have won at least 5 gold medals at the World Championships. Boldface denotes active wrestlers and highest medal count among all wrestlers (including these who not included in these tables) per type.

Men's freestyle

Men's Greco-Roman

Women's freestyle

See also

 Wrestling World Cup
 World Wrestling Clubs Cup
 List of World Championships medalists in wrestling (freestyle)
 List of World Championships medalists in wrestling (Greco-Roman)
 List of World Championships medalists in wrestling (women)
 List of World and Olympic Champions in men's freestyle wrestling
 List of World and Olympic Champions in Greco-Roman wrestling
 List of World and Olympic Champions in women's freestyle wrestling
 World Beach Wrestling Championships

References

External links
 FILA Database
 Hosts of World Championships 2021 and 2022

 
Wrestling competitions
Wrestling
Recurring sporting events established in 1904